Gurzil was an important ancient Berber deity. He is known from two sources, the Latin poem Iohannis by the 6th-century Christian Roman poet Corippus and a Neo-Punic inscription from Lepcis Magna.

According to Corippus, the Laguatan of Tripolitania carried a representation of Gurzil in the form of a bull into battle against the Romans when they revolted along with the Austurii in AD 546. They regarded Gurzil as the offspring of Amun, presumably the Amun whose temple was at Siwa, and a cow. Corippus also mentions idols of wood and metal, presumably also images of Gurzil. After several battles the Laguatan and their allies were defeated. Ierna, the chief and high priest of the Laguatan, was killed while trying to rescue the image of Gurzil. The image was destroyed. The combination of royal and priestly functions in Ierna is not otherwise attested among ancient Berbers.

The Neo-Punic inscription is partially damaged and resists interpretation. The last four letters of the first line spell the name of Gurzil, while the first four of the second line spell Satur. If the latter is the Roman god Saturn it suggests that he was equated with Gurzil per an interpretatio Romana. This would be the only known instance of such an interpretation among the Berbers. The inscription may be read "[so-and-so] endowed the expenses for Gurzil–Saturn".

The name of Gurzil may be detected elsewhere in the toponymy of Tripolitania. A temple among the ruins of Gerisa (Ghirza) in Libya may have been dedicated to Gurzil, and the name of the town itself may even be related to his name. According to the 9th-century Muslim writer al-Bakrī, there was a placed called Gherza in Tripolitania with a hilltop sanctuary containing a stone idol that the Berber tribes from the surrounding region still worshipped.

The relief carving of a horned god at Volubilis has been tentatively identified as Gurzil. This would be the only evidence of his worship outside of Tripolitania, but the identification is highly speculative.

References 

Berber gods
Roman Libya
War gods